Rubus nelsonii is an uncommon Mexican species of brambles in the rose family. It has been found only in the State of Oaxaca in southern Mexico.

Rubus nelsonii is a perennial with stems up to 4 meters long, reclining on walls, rocks, or other vegetation. Stems are purple, hairy and with relatively few, weak curved prickles. Leaves are compound with 3 or 5 leaflets. Flowers are white. Fruits are dark purple.

References

nelsonii
Flora of Oaxaca
Plants described in 1913